Compton Creek is a stream in Ripley County in the U.S. state of Missouri. It is a tributary of the Current River.

Compton Creek has the name of John Compton, a  pioneer citizen.

See also
List of rivers of Missouri

References

Rivers of Ripley County, Missouri
Rivers of Missouri